Walter Harrison (16 January 1923 – 1979) was an English footballer who played in the Football League for Chesterfield and Leicester City.

External links
 Walter Harrison stats at Neil Brown stat site

English footballers
English Football League players
1923 births
1979 deaths
Coalville Town F.C. players
Leicester City F.C. players
Chesterfield F.C. players
Corby Town F.C. players
Association football wing halves
Date of death missing
Place of death missing
FA Cup Final players